Sacrifice is a 2000 thriller television film, starring Michael Madsen. It was written by Randall Frakes, based on a novel by Mitchell Smith and directed by Mark L. Lester.

Plot
Tyler Pierce, a convicted bank robber who just recently escaped the prison, joins with a former call girl to investigate the murder of his daughter. They soon discover that they are dealing with a serial killer.

Cast
 Michael Madsen as Tyler Pierce
 Bokeem Woodbine as FBI Agent Gottfried
 Michelle Lintel as FBI Agent Hildebrandt
 Jamie Luner as Naomi Cohen
 Diane Farr as Karen Yeager
 Deborah Shelton as Margaret Sackett
 Jordan Williams as Carl Sackett
 Tony Abatemarco as Phil Lombardi
 Wallace Merck as Sergeant George Burney
 Marco St. John as Dr. Hector Salcodo
 Joshua Leonard as Jason
 Terence Rosemore as Horatio (Terrence Rosemore)
 Guss Williams as Tomas Seguin (Gus Williams)
 Matt Webb as Rusty
 Michelle White as Lisa Pierce
 Jackie Roberts as Mimi Gould
 Janice Finch as Maria Mitchell 
 Leslie Zemeckis as Officer Mercedes Calderon (Leslie Harter)
 Lonnie R. Smith as Blue Masked Robber (Lonnie Smith)

Reception
Andy Webb from The Movie Scene gave the film three out of five stars and wrote: "What this all boils down to is that "Sacrifice" is really a bad movie; it has weak acting, poor action and irrelevant subplots. Yet all the wrong stuff ends up being as entertaining as the right stuff which makes "Sacrifice" surprisingly enjoyable." Richard Scheib from Moria.co gave it two stars, stating: "Sacrifice starts well. Michael Madsen’s central character is unusually conceived as a hero goes and the film is tightly plotted, consistently keeping one’s interest. Alas, Sacrifice fails to sustain such interest for its full length. Indeed, despite the unusualness of the central character and an interesting plot set-up, by about halfway point all of this has dissipated and Sacrifice has become merely a routine policier." Jack Sommersby from eFilmCritic gave the movie two stars and wrote: "The film isn't terrible, just terribly dull, with a who-cares hero registering near zero on both the dramatic and charismatic scale. I'd be happy to predict that Madsen probably has a good film in him somewhere down the line, but after seeing his 2009 slate of no less than twenty-eight(!) projects, it's safe to concretely conclude that here's an ultra-slumming actor preferring quantity over quality. A The Wrestler couldn't come along soon enough."

References

External links
 
 

American thriller films
2000 thriller films
2000 films
Films directed by Mark L. Lester
2000s English-language films
2000s American films